Local elections were held in Busia County to elect a Governor and County Assembly on 4 March 2013. Under the new constitution, which was passed in a 2010 referendum, the 2013 general elections were the first in which Governors and members of the County Assemblies for the newly created counties were elected.  They will also be the first general elections run by the Independent Electoral and Boundaries Commission(IEBC) which has released the official list of candidates.

Gubernatorial election

Prospective candidates
The following are some of the candidates who have made public their intentions to run:
 Philemon Imo
 Sospeter Ojaamong
 Vincent Sidai
 Kizito Wangalwa

References

 

2013 local elections in Kenya